Hymn of Crimea is the official anthem of Crimea. Its Russian-language text was written by Olga Golubeva and the music was composed by Alemdar Karamanov. The anthem was selected in a contest held by the Verkhovna Rada of Crimea on 26 February 1992 and officially adopted on 18 October 2000.

The anthem is used by both the Autonomous Republic of Crimea of Ukraine and the Republic of Crimea claimed by Russia.

Lyrics

See also
 National anthem of Russia
 Shche ne vmerla Ukrainy, the national anthem of Ukraine
 Ant etkenmen, the anthem of the Crimean Tatars
 Flag of Crimea
 Coat of arms of Crimea

References

External links
 nationalanthems.infoCrimea

European anthems
Regional songs
Symbols of Crimea
Ukrainian songs
Russian songs
National anthem compositions in F major